The women's 1500 metres event at the 2004 African Championships in Athletics was held in Brazzaville, Republic of the Congo on July 18.

Results

References
Results

2004 African Championships in Athletics
1500 metres at the African Championships in Athletics
2004 in women's athletics